The Rudrayamala (Sanskrit: रुद्रयामल; IAST: Rudrayāmala), also known as Rudra Yamala or Rudra-Yamala, is considered one of the most important Sanskrit Tantric texts. It is divided into 64 chapters.

References 

Tantra
Hindu texts